Pudłowski (feminine: Pudłowska) is a  Polish noble family name of . It may refer to:

Gilles Pudlowski (born 1950), French food critic
Zenon J. Pudlowski (born 1943), Polish engineer and educator
Mary Lucy Denise Pudlowski, birth name of Marilu Henner, American actress and author
 

Polish-language surnames